Below is the list of railway stations in Romania. Although there are hundreds of stations only those stations which can be linked to articles in Wikipedia are shown.

railway stations
railway stations
Romania